Moonrise is the second studio album by South Korean pop rock band Day6. It was released by JYP Entertainment on December 6, 2017. The album features 18 tracks, consisting of all 10 tracks that were previously released from July to November 2017 through Every Day6, tracks from Every Day6 December, and final versions of the five remaining songs from their first EP The Day.

Track listing

Charts

References 

JYP Entertainment albums
Korean-language albums
2017 albums
Genie Music albums
Day6 albums